Thaddeus Lynch (born 1882), more commonly known as Ted, was a Northern Ireland politician and Bar owner.

Lynch was born in Arigna, County Roscommon in 1882. As a young man he moved to Belfast to find employment and started work in a bar washing glasses. Becoming a business man over time he succeeded in buying his own public house and eventually owned three bars in Belfast, The Monaco, The  Criterion and Lynches .

He was a senator in the Senate of Northern Ireland from 1941 to 1949.

He had nine children, six sons (Patrick Dominic, Gerard, John and Timothy and  Edmond ) and three daughters (Madeleine, Marie and Nan).

His interest in politics was carried on by subsequent generations and his daughter Madeleine Bradley was active in the establishment of the Alliance Party of Northern Ireland.

His grandson, Thaddeus (Ted) Lynch Bradley, has also been a member of the Green Party.

References

1882 births
Drinking establishment owners
Year of death missing
Members of the Senate of Northern Ireland 1941–1945
Members of the Senate of Northern Ireland 1945–1949
British publicans
Nationalist Party (Ireland) members of the Senate of Northern Ireland